Shelton is a village and former civil parish, now in the parish of Dean and Shelton, in the Bedford district, in the ceremonial county of Bedfordshire, England. In 1931 the parish had a population of 101. On 1 April 1934 the parish was abolished and merged with Dean to form "Dean and Shelton".

It is close to the county border with Northamptonshire and the district of Huntingdonshire in Cambridgeshire.

The 14th century Church of St Mary the Virgin is located in the village. It is a grade I listed building.

References

Villages in Bedfordshire
Former civil parishes in Bedfordshire
Borough of Bedford